Serrano Futebol Clube may refer to:
Serrano Futebol Clube (PE), Brazilian football in Pernambuco state
Serrano Football Club, Brazilian football in Rio state